Ring Christmas Bells may refer to:

 Ring Christmas Bells (album), a 2009 Christmas album by the Mormon Tabernacle Choir feat. Brian Stokes Mitchell
 Carol of the Bells